This is a list of all cricketers who have played first-class, list A or Twenty20 cricket for Madhya Pradesh cricket team (formerly called Holkar cricket team). Seasons given are first and last seasons; the player did not necessarily play in all the intervening seasons. Players in bold have played international cricket.

Last updated at the end of the 2015-16 season.

A 

 Avesh Khan - 
 Abbas Ali - 
 Anil Acharya - 
 Vipin Acharya - 
 S Aditya, 
 
 Rish Ahir, 
 Kadir Ahmed, 
 abhijeet Singh,
 Anand Singh, 
 Javed Ansari, 
 Suhail Ansari, 
 Anurag Singh, 
 Ashutosh Singh, 
 Asif Ali, 
 Vijay Awasthy, 
 Ayaan Khan,

B 

 Narendra Bagatheria, 1969/70-1983/84
 Salman Baig, 2009/10-2014/15
 Anand Bais, 2012/13-2015/16
 Rahul Bakshi, 2003/04-2012/13
 Pradeep Banerjee, 1977/78-1980/81
 Shute Banerjee, 1959/60
 Padmakar Barlingay, 1955/56-1956/57
 Jagdeep Baveja, 2015/16
 Jagdeep Baweja, 2015/16
 Suthar  Bhagwandas, 1958/59-1978/79
 Harpreet Singh Bhatia, 2007/08-present
 Ramesh Bhatia, 1959/60-1973/74
 K. Bhatnagar, 1948/49, 1949/50
 Sarvesh Bhatnagar, 1988/89
 Abhinav Bhatt, 2001/02
 P Bhave, 1965/66-1968/69
 RK Bhave,	1954/55
 Madhav Bhide, 1954/55
 Bhupinder Singh, 1985/86
 Udit Birla, 2009/10-present
 MV Bobjee, 1957/58
 Devendra Bundela,	1995/96-present

C 

 Govind Chauhan, 1970/71
 PM Chauhan, 1954/55
 Rajesh Chauhan, 1988/89-2000/01
 Avinash Chitale, 1961/62
 Dinesh Chopra, 1994/95-1996/97
 Satyam Choudhary, 2012/13-2014/15

D 
 Hemu Dalvi, 1958/59-1959/60
 SP Dalvi,	1970/71
 Ankit Dane, 2015/16
 Ashwin Das, 2015/16
 Tapan Das, 1973/74
 Puneet Datey, 2013/14-present
 Rajesh Dave, 1980/81-1982/83
 TN Deo, 1953/54
 Kiran Deodhar, 1982/83
 Shashank Deshmukh, 1982/83-1983/84
 Dinkar Deshpande,	1955/56-1956/57
 Sohrab Dhaliwal,	2013/14-present
 Sushil Dhama, 1976/77
 Sunil Dholpure, 2001/02-2008/09
 Ramesh Divecha, 1954/55
 Vishnu Dixit, 1957/58-1958/59
 Narendra Dua, 1963/64-1974/75
 Rajeev Dua, 1986/87-1987/88
 Durga Das, 1960/61
 Prashant Dwevedi,	1987/88-1998/99

G 

 Hiralal Gaekwad, 1957/58-1963/64
 VR Ghetge, 1942/43
 DS Godbole, 1952/53-1953/54
 KG Gokhale,  1957/58
 PM Gokhale, 1954/55-1955/56
 Yogesh Golwalkar, 2000/01-2008/09
 Gopal Singh, 1957/58
 Gulrez Ali, 1965/66-1984/85
 Avadesh Gupta, 1976/77-1982/83
 Gurudyal Singh, 1951/52
 Gurusharan Singh,	2000/01

H 

 Mehmood Hassan, 1966/67-1974/75
 Manzur Hasan, 1976/77-1986/87
 Mihir Hirwani 2014/15-present
 Narendra Hirwani 1984/85-2005/06

I 

 Shridhar Iyer, 2009/10
 Venkatesh Iyer, 2014/15-present

J 

 Ashutosh Jadhav, 2006/07-2009/10
 Udai Jadhav, 1959/60-1965/66
 Ashok Jagdale, 1961/62-1979/80
 Sanjay Jagdale, 1968/69-1982/83
 DR Jagtap, 1958/59
 Sobodh Jain, 1985/86-1987/88
 Saransh Jain, 2013/14-present
 Jamnadas Daga, 1951/52-1955/56
 Bhagtheria Jayantilal, 1961/62-1967/68
 SS Jog, 1950/51-1952/53
 A Joshi, 1970/71-1971/72
 Sashi Joshi, 1982/83

K 
 SR Kale, 1943/44
 Hrishikesh Kanitkar, 2008/09-2009/10
 Rajesh Kannojiya,	2006/07-2008/09
 Devang Kapadia, 1989/90-1991/92
 MG Karu, 1950/51
 RK Kaul, 1954/55
 AD Kelkar, 1953/54
 AK Kelkar, 1952/53-1954/55
 Kamraj Kesari, 1950/51-1956/57
 Akhil Khan, 1964/65
 Ahsan H Khan, 1958/59-1960/61
 Asadullah Khan, 1984/85
 Mehmood Khan, 1981/82-1982/83
 Jogesh Khattar, 1962/63-1964/65
 Balkrishna Kher, 1962/63-1965/66
 HM Kher, 1958/59-1961/62
 Amay Khurasiya, 1989/90-2006/07
 Ravi Kohli, 1990/91
 Amal Kokje, 2003/04
 Sulkashan Kulkarni, 2001/02
 UM Kumre,	1956/57
 SN Kunzru, 1943/44 (Kunzru made a single first-class appearance for the team, then called Gwalior, against Delhi)
 Ankit Kushwah, 2014/15-present

L 

 Abhay Laghate, 1984/85-1988/89
 Sunil Lahore, 1985/86-2000/01
 Jitender Likhar, 2001/02-2004/05
 Cyril Lobo, 1955/56

M 

 Manoj Kumar Bais, 2014 to present
 Jiva Malak, 1954/55-1956/57
 Surendra Malviya, 2013/14-2014/15
 MV Mandpe, 1952/53-1953/54
 Maninder Singh, 2000/01
 SM Manohar, 1953/54
 B Marfatia jr, 1957/58
 B Marfatia sr, 1957/58-1958/59
 Sohail Masood, 2005/06
 RD Mathur, 1943/44
 R Matkar,	1957/58-1962/63
 Mehmood Khan, 1972/73
 Narendra Menon, 2003/04
 Nitin Menon, 1967/68-1981/82
 VV Mirashi, 1959/60
 GD Mishra, 1951/52
 Mohnish Mishra, 2000/01-2015/16
 Sanjay Mishra, 2014/15
 V Mohandas, 1993/94
 UH Munshi, 1956/57
 Murtuza Ali, 2006/07-2013/14
 Mushtaq Ali, 1957/58

N 

 Arjun Naidu, 1955/56
 G Naidu, 1960/61
 Gopi Naidu, 1950/51-1951/52
 Kappu Naidu, 1958/59
 Suraya Naidu, 1954/55
 Sheshrao Naidu, 1951/52
 Ashotosh Naik, 1976/77-1980/81
 S Naqvi,	1981/82
 V Narang, 1967/68-1974/75
 R Narasimhan, 1950/51-1955/56
 CN Nayudu, 1959/60
 CS Nayudu, 1960/61
 Prakash Nayudu, 1957/58-1961/62
 Vijay Nayudu, 1960/61-1977/78
 Rajendra Nigam, 1974/75-1976/77
 Devashish Nilosey, 1984/85-1995/96
 Narayan Nivsarkar, 1957/58-1960/61
 S Nivsarkar, 1966/67

O 

 Naman Ojha, 2000/01-2015/16

P 
 Manish Panchasara, 1997/98
 Pankan Pande, 1975/76
 Anshuman Pandey, 1995/96-1996/97
 Ishwer Pandey, 2009/10-2015/16
 Sanjay Pandey, 1996/97-2009/10
 Chandrakant Pandit, 1994/95-2000/01
 R Pandit, 1962/63
 KD Paranjpe, 1954/55
 Dhiraj Parekh, 1960/61
 RS Parihar, 1983/84
 Devendra Parmar, 1993/94-2001/02
 Mudassar Pasha, 2001/02-2007/08
 SG Patankar, 1958/59
 Anand Patel, 1976/77-1982/83
 GL Patel, 1952/53
 Kirti Patel, 1987/88-1997/98
 Mukesh Patel, 1975/76
 Paramanandbhai Patel, 1953/54
 Ramnik Patel, 1982/83-1988/89
 Sharavan Patel, 1964/65-1976/77
 Ambalal Patidar, 2001/02
 Rajat Patidar, 2015/16
 Sandeep Patil, 1988/89-1992/93
 Nikhil Patwardhan, 1997/98-2005/06
 Amit Paul, 2004/05-2008/09
 Vinod Pendarkar, 1962/63-1969/70
 Shantanu Pitre, 2003/04-2008/09
 Kannu Powar, 1957/58-1965/66
 Atul Prabhakar, 1991/92-1993/94
 Prable Pratap Singh, 2009/10
 A Puranik, 1983/84

R 

 Rafiq Khan, 1970/71-1974/75
 Syedm Rahim, 1950/51-1956/57
 PK Rai, 1960/61-1961/62
 Raja Ali, 1996/97-1999/00
 Krishnamurthy Rajagopalan, 1991/92-1999/00
 Anand Rajan, 2005/06-2013/14
 Ajay Rajput, 2012/13
 Rama Rao, 1959/60-1960/61
 Rameez Khan, 2007/08-2015/16
 Ranawat, 1960/61
 Khandu Rangnekar, 1958/59
 Gopal Rao, 1975/76-1984/85
 Pankaj Rao, 2008/09
 Vineet Rao, 1974/75-1980/81
 MV Ravindra, 1959/60
 Yogesh Rawat, 2013/14-2015/16
 ZE Reshamwalla, 1955/56
 Riaz Khan, 1952/53-1955/56

S 
 Srajan Bhasin, 2005/06-
 Sabarwal, 1965/66-1966/67
 Anup Sabnis, 1983/84-1984/85
 Himalaya Sagar, 2007/08-2008/09
 Mukesh Sahni from 1984/85 to 1995/96, and later became a coach for the team. He is the father of current MP player Parth Sahani.
 Sumit Sharma, 2018/19-2020/21
 Mukesh Sahni, 1984/85-1995/96
 Chandraprakash Sahu, 1996/97-2002/03
 Santosh Sahu, 1998/99-1999/00
 Sudhir Sahu, 1956/57
 Mohammad Saif, 1994/95-1996/97
 Chandrakant Sakure, 2015/16
 Salim Ali Khan, 1961/62-1964/65
 Wasuderao Sane, 1950/51-1954/55
 Chandu Sarwate, 1958/59-1967/68
 MK Sarwate, 1950/51-1956/57
 T. Seshachalam, 2010/11-2015/16
 Mahendra Satokar,	1984/85-1991/92
 Ramesh Satokar, 1983/84
 Nikhil Sawke, 2013/14
 Jalaj Saxena, 2005/06-2015/16
 Jatin Saxena, 2001/02-2014/15
 Subodh Saxena, 1962/63-1981/82
 TA Sekhar, 1988/89-1989/90
 Kapil Seth, 2000/01
 Shadab Khan, 2006/07-2009/10
 J Shah,  1964/65
 Shan-E-Alam, 2006/07
 Daya Shankar, 1943/44
 Amit Sharma, 2010/11-2012/13
 Ankit Sharma, 2009/10-2015/16
 Ashok Sharma, 1999/00
 Manohar Sharma, 1959/60-1975/76
 Shubham S Sharma, 2013/14-2014/15
 Varunesh Sharma, 2012/13
 Karun Shekawat, 1975/76-1983/84
 Shinde, 1970/71-1971/72
 Niranjan Shirke,	1981/82
 Aditya Shrivastava, 2014/15-2015/16
 Rohan Shrivastava, 2009/10
 Mahendra Shukla, 1947/48
 Shyam Lal, 1957/58-1959/60
 Balbhadra Singh, 1941/42
 Chandra Singh, 1985/86-1991/92
 PP Singh, 1970/71
 Sachin Deshmukh, 1996-97-98-99-2000
 Ram Singh, 1943/44
 Roop Singh, 1943/44
 Surinder Singh, 1964/65
 Harvinder Singh Sodhi	1990/91-2003/04
 Ankit Srivastava	1999/00-2000/01
 Linganath Subbu	1959/60
 TP Sudhindra, 2005/06-2011/12
 Suryaveer Singh, 1958/59
 Shubham Verma, 2007/2009

T 

 Rohit Talwar, 1982/83-1989/90
 KS Thakur, 1950/51
 Sridhar Thakur, 1950/51
 Tiwari, 1965/66
 Mahendra Tiwari, 1983/84-1987/88
 Brijesh Tomar, 2002/03-2008/09

V 

 MV Vaidya, 1952/53
 Jitendra Vegad, 1985/86-1987/88
 R Venkataraman, 1954/55-1955/56
 Avijit Verma, 2005/06
 Bharat Verma, 1995/96
 Ravi Verma, 1984/85-1986/87
 Amitabh Vijayvargiya, 1986/87-1993/94
 Sunil  Vyas, 1977/78

W 

 A Wagh, 1983/84
 Abdul Wahid, 1974/75-1975/76

Y 

 Gaurav Yadav, 2012/13-2014/15
 JP Yadav, 1994/95-2012/13
 Omprakash Yadav, 2001/02
 Rishi Yengde, 2003/04-2004/05

Z 

 Zafar Ali, 2006/07-2015/16
 Zuber Khan, 1992/93-1994/95

References 

Madhya Pradesh cricketers

cricketers
Cricket in Madhya Pradesh